Rutilius Taurus Aemilianus Palladius, also known as Palladius Rutilius Taurus Aemilianus or most often just as Palladius, was an ancient writer who wrote in Latin, and is dated variously to the later 4th century or first half of the 5th century AD. He is principally known for his book on agriculture, Opus agriculturae, sometimes known as De re rustica.

Biography
Since the Middle Ages, authors of agricultural treatises have referred often to Palladius. The Palladii were a prominent Gallic family, and the name Palladius is probably a family name (of Greek origin), with Aemilianus his cognomen (of Roman origin). In late antiquity, the convention of the tria nomina ("three names") for Roman men was no longer standard, and the greater variation in naming practice contributes to the uncertainty over the correct order of his names. Evidence for his life is scant. Manuscripts of his work call him a vir illustris, which would indicate high rank. Although Palladius relies heavily on earlier agricultural writers, he himself owned farms in Italy and Sardinia, and had considerable experience of farming, with a special interest in fruit trees.

Opus agriculturae
The Opus agriculturae is a treatise on farming in 14 parts or books, written in the late fourth or early fifth century AD. The first book is general and introductory. Books 2 to 13 give detailed instructions for the typical activities on a Roman farm for each month of the year, starting with January. Each of these calendrical books has sections on field crops, vegetable gardens, fruit trees and other trees, and livestock. The fourteenth book, De Veterinaria Medicina, was rediscovered only in the 20th century, and gives instructions for the care of animals and elements of veterinary science. All of this is in prose, but Palladius also appended a poem, De Insitione, On Grafting, consisting of eighty-five couplets of elegiac verse.

Palladius' work stands in the tradition of Roman agricultural treatises, represented particularly by Marcus Priscus Cato, Marcus Terentius Varro, Lucius Junius Moderatus Columella, and Gargilius Martialis. His chief contribution was to reduce the exhaustive works of Columella and Martialis to an appropriate scale for the practical farmer, while at the same time re-organising them on a calendrical basis, to provide the farmer with a checklist of the tasks needing attention each month.

The work of Palladius was well known in the Middle Ages. A translation into Middle English verse survives from about 1420, entitled On Husbondrie; it can be seen as part of a genre of instructional agricultural writing that was to develop in England into works such as those of Thomas Tusser and Gervase Markham. Two notable thirteenth century works that draw on Palladius are the Commoda ruralia of Petrus de Crescentius, written c. 1305 and printed at Augsburg in 1471; and the Speculum Maius of Vincentius Bellovacensis (Vincent de Beauvais) written about 1250 and first printed in Strasbourg in 1473–76. There are a number of other incunabula or early editions.

Water-mills

The book is known for reference to a water-mill in Book 1, ch. 41, where Palladius suggests that waste water from bath buildings should be used to drive a mill. Such mills had been described by Vitruvius in 25 BC, and there is a growing number of examples of such Roman water-mills. The most spectacular is the set of 16 mills at Barbegal in southern France, using water fed by a stone aqueduct along the line of the same aqueduct which supplied nearby Arles.

Principal early editions

The earliest editions of Palladius group his works with those on agriculture of Cato the Elder, Varro and Columella. Some modern library catalogues follow Brunet in listing these under "Rei rusticae scriptores" or "Scriptores rei rusticae".

 Georgius Merula, Franciscus Colucia (eds.) De re rustica. Opera et impensa Nicolai Ienson: Venetiis, 1472
 Rei rusticae authores. Regii: opera et impensis Bartholomei Bruschi al' Botoni, Regiensis, 1482
 . Impensis Benedicti hectoris: Bonon., xiii. calen. octob. [19 September], 1494 
 .  [printed by Jean Marchant], [1512]
 . Venetiis: In aedibus Aldi et Andreae soceri, mense Maio, 1514
 . Impressum Florentiæ: Philippi Iuntæ, [1515]
 Richard Bradley A Survey of the Ancient Husbandry and Gardening collected from Cato, Varro, Columella, Virgil, and others, the most eminent writers among the Greeks & Romans: wherein many of the most difficult passages in those authors are explain'd ... Adorn'd with cuts, etc.. London: B. Motte, 1725
 Johann Matthias Gesner (ed.) Scriptores Rei Rusticae veteres Latini Cato, Varro, Columella, Palladius, quibus nunc accedit Vegetius de Mulo-Medicina et Gargilii Martialis fragmentum (Ausoni Popinæ De instrumento fundi liber. J. B. Morgagni epist. IV.) cum editionibus prope omnibus et MSS. pluribus collati: adjectae notae virorum clariss. integræ ... et lexicon Rei Rusticae curante Io. Matthia Gesnero. Lipsiae: sumtibus Caspari Fritsch, 1735

See also
 Ancient Rome and wine

References

Further reading
 Bartoldus, Marco Johannes Palladius Rutilius Taurus Aemilianus: Welt und Wert spätrömischer Landwirtschaft. Augsburg (Wißner-Verlag), 2nd edit., 2014. 
 Brodersen, Kai Palladius: Das Bauernjahr. Latin/German, Sammlung Tusculum, Berlin and Boston (de Gruyter) 2016. 
 Fitch, John G. (transl.) Palladius: The Work of Farming. Totnes (Prospect Books), 2013. 
 Rodgers, Robert H. (ed.) Palladius Opus Agriculturae, De Veterinaria Medicina, De Insitione. Leipzig (Teubner) 1975. 
 Rodgers, Robert H. An Introduction to Palladius. University of London, Institute of Classical Studies, Bulletin Supplement 35. London, 1975.

External links

Full Latin text of Opus agriculturae
Full text in English of Palladius's Fourteen books on Agriculture (as translated in year 1807 by T. Owen)
Late medieval English translation of Palladius's On Agriculture

Year of birth unknown
Year of death unknown
Geoponici
4th-century Latin writers
5th-century Latin writers
4th-century Romans
5th-century Romans
Rutilii